Yaroslav Filchakov is a Ukrainian wrestler. He participated at the 2022 World Wrestling Championships, being awarded in the bronze medal in the men's Greco-Roman 82 kg event. Filchakov was against Burhan Akbudak for which the score was 5-1, in which he was awarded the bronze medal along with Tamás Lévai.

He competed in the 80kg event at the 2016 World Wrestling Championships held in Budapest, Hungary. In 2020, he competed in the 82 kg event at the Individual Wrestling World Cup held in Belgrade, Serbia.

He competed in the 82kg event at the European Wrestling Championships in 2019, 2021 and 2022.

In 2021, he won one of the bronze medals in the 82 kg event at the Grand Prix Zagreb Open held in Zagreb, Croatia. A year later, he won the gold medal in this event at the 2022 Grand Prix Zagreb Open.

References

External links 

Living people
Place of birth missing (living people)
Year of birth missing (living people)
Ukrainian male sport wrestlers
World Wrestling Championships medalists
21st-century Ukrainian people